Nicotera is a municipality in the province of Vibo Valentia, Calabria, southern Italy.

Nicotera may also refer to:

 I Nicotera, a 1972 Italian drama television miniseries

People  
 Giacomo Nicotera, an Italian rugby union player
 Giovanni Nicotera, an Italian patriot and politician
 Mary Lewis Nicotera, a retired American judoka
 Niko Nicotera, a German-born American actor